On Stage may refer to:

Music
 Jim Reeves on Stage, a 1968 live album by Jim Reeves
 Neil Sedaka On Stage, a 1974 live album by Neil Sedaka
 On Stage (EP), a 1979 EP by Kate Bush
 On Stage (Gerald Wilson album), a 1965 album by the Gerald Wilson Orchestra
 Hep Stars on Stage, a 1965 album by the Hep Stars, commonly referred to as On Stage
 On Stage (Elvis Presley album), a 1970 live album by Elvis Presley
 On Stage (Loggins and Messina album), a 1974 live album by Loggins and Messina
 On Stage (Rainbow album), a 1977 double live album by Rainbow
 On Stage (The Exploited album), a 1981 album by The Exploited

Other
On Stage, a comic strip later retitled Mary Perkins, On Stage
On Stage, a radio anthology series that aired in the 1950s
 On Stage, a television program about New York City theatre; airs on NY1